The Battle of Bucaramanga was a military action of the Revolution of 1854, a conflict between the Republic of New Granada and the insurgents of José María Melo. It was held on July 12, 1854, in the city of Bucaramanga, Santander, Colombia. On the night of July 10 the commander Clímaco Rincón left with 90 men for Bucaramanga, in order to attack Collazos, after its alliance with the rebel Colonel Dámaso Girón was proven.

References

Bucaramanga 1854
History of Panama
History of Colombia
1850s in the Republic of New Granada
1850s in Colombia
1854 in the Republic of New Granada